Torgu Parish was a rural municipality at the tip of the Sõrve Peninsula on the island of Saaremaa in western Estonia. It is a part of Saare County.

This parish consisted of 22 villages. The municipality had a population of 375 (as of 1 January 2006) and covered an area of 126.44 km².

During the administrative-territorial reform in 2017, all 12 municipalities on the island Saaremaa were merged into a single municipality – Saaremaa Parish.

Kingdom of Torgu 

In 1992, following independence from the Soviet Union, an error in the new constitution of Estonia led to Torgu being left out. In response, the area's 500 inhabitants decided to form their own kingdom. Journalist and activist Kirill Teiter became its first monarch. The following year, the error was corrected and Torgu officially became part of Estonia. Nevertheless, the kingdom's flag and coat of arms can still be seen in the parish.

Villages
Hänga - Iide - Jämaja - Kaavi - Kargi - Karuste - Kaunispe - Laadla - Läbara - Lindmetsa - Lõupõllu - Lülle - Maantee - Mäebe - Mässa - Mõisaküla - Mõntu - Ohessaare - Sääre - Soodevahe - Tammuna - Türju

See also
 Municipalities of Estonia

References

External links